Gundu may refer to:

Gundu Island
Gundu, Nepal